The 2011 Q Hotel & Spa Women's Pro Tennis Classic was a professional tennis tournament played on hard courts. It was the third edition of the tournament which is part of the 2011 ITF Women's Circuit. It took place in Kansas City, Missouri, between 3 and 9 October 2011.

WTA entrants

Seeds

 1 Rankings are as of September 26, 2011.

Other entrants
The following players received wildcards into the singles main draw:
  Lauren Davis (withdrew)
  Maria Sanchez
  Yasmin Schnack
  Olivia Sneed

The following players received entry from the qualifying draw:
  Eugenie Bouchard
  Alexandra Mueller
  Asia Muhammad (withdrew)
  Marie-Ève Pelletier

The following players received entry by a lucky loser spot:
  Brianna Morgan
  Piia Suomalainen
  Romana Tedjakusuma

Champions

Singles

 Varvara Lepchenko def.  Romina Oprandi, 6–4, 6–1

Doubles

 Maria Abramović /  Eva Hrdinová def.  Jamie Hampton /  Ajla Tomljanović, 2–6, 6–2, [10–4]

External links
Official Website
ITF Search 

Q Hotel and Spa Women's Pro Tennis Classic
Q Hotel and Spa Women's Pro Tennis Classic
Hard court tennis tournaments in the United States